Tracy Grose (born in St. Charles, Missouri) is an NCAA soccer coach and former professional soccer player. Grose currently serves as the administrative assistant for the Southern Illinois University Edwardsville men's program.

Early life
While playing for JB Marine SC in St. Louis, Mo., Grose was a member of two national championship teams. Grose's 1998 (U23) and 1993 (U16) squads were champions, while taking third place in 1995 (U18).

Indiana University
 1998 NSCAA All American (First woman All American in Indiana history); 1998 NSCAA All Great Lakes Region 1st Team; 1998 1st Team All Big Ten; 1998 Indiana school record, single season scoring (37 points on 15 goals, 7 assists); led Indiana to 2nd Round of NCAA tournament
 1996 Big Ten Freshman Player of the Year; 2nd Team All Big Ten Conference

Professional

Carolina Courage

References

External links
 Iowa State coach profile
 Carolina Courage player profile (archived)

Living people
American women's soccer players
Women's United Soccer Association players
Carolina Courage players
American soccer coaches
Northern Arizona Lumberjacks coaches
Indiana Hoosiers women's soccer coaches
Indiana Hoosiers women's soccer players
Women's association football forwards
Year of birth missing (living people)
Soccer players from St. Louis